The 2017–18 FC Carl Zeiss Jena season is the 115th season in the football club's history 5th overall season in the 3. Liga, the third tier of German football, having been promoted from the Regionalliga Nordost in 2017. In addition to the domestic league, Carl Zeiss Jena also participated in this season's edition of the Thuringian Cup, the regional cup for teams in Thuringia. Jena play their matches at the Ernst-Abbe-Sportfeld, located in Jena, Thuringia, Germany. The season covers a period from 1 July 2017 to 30 June 2018.

Players

Squad information

Competitions

Overview

3. Liga

League table

Results summary

Results by round

Matches

Thuringian Cup

References

FC Carl Zeiss Jena seasons
Jena